Argenton-sur-Creuse is a commune in the Indre department in central France.

Geography

Argenton-sur-Creuse lies on the river Creuse, about 28 km southwest of Châteauroux. Argenton-sur-Creuse station has rail connections to Vierzon, Limoges and Paris. The A20 autoroute (Vierzon–Limoges–Montauban) passes west of the town. The village of Saint-Benoît-du-Sault is 20 minutes away by road. South of Argenton is the valley of the river Creuse. The village of Gargilesse is nearby; there the home of the writer George Sand may be visited.

History
The modern city is built close to the site of the Gallo-Roman city of Argentomagus which lies a little to the north.  The site has been developed as a museum visitor attraction. The name of the ancient town probably derives from the Latin word for "silver", as the town was a center of silver work.

The Encyclopædia Britannica Eleventh Edition (1911) described the city as follows: "The river is crossed by two bridges, and its banks are bordered by picturesque old houses. There are numerous tanneries, and the manufacture of boots, shoes and linen goods is carried on". Since then, one of the riverside mills has been converted into the "Museum of the Shirt and Masculine Elegance".

Notable people
 Antoine Berman (1942-1991), translator and philosopher
 Gilles Clément (born 1943), botanist and writer
 Raymond Rollinat (1859-1931), naturalist
 Germaine Rouillard (1881–1946)
 Michel Sapin (born 1952), politician

Population

See also
Communes of the Indre department

References

External links

Tourist Information Office website (in French)
Argentomagus museum website (English-language version)

Communes of Indre
Berry, France
Bituriges Cubi
Gallia Aquitania
Indre communes articles needing translation from French Wikipedia